Nohar railway station is a railway station in Hanumangarh district, Rajasthan. Its code is NHR. It serves Nohar town. The station consists of 2 platforms. Passenger, Express, and Superfast trains halt here.

Trains

The following trains halt at Nohar railway station in both directions:

 Bikaner–Bilaspur Antyodaya Express

References

Railway stations in Hanumangarh district
Bikaner railway division